The European Super Cup was the former name of the UEFA Super Cup, a European association football competition.

European Super Cup may refer to:

 IIHF Super Cup, in ice hockey
 FIBA Europe Super Cup, in women's basketball

See also
Super Cup, other competitions outside Europe